Dr Alastair Macdonald is a Scottish historian. He is the Mackie Lecturer in History at the University of Aberdeen.

His field of research is Scotland-England relations during the late medieval period (1369-1403), particularly the development of "Frontier societies" and Scotland's place in the wider world during this period. His current research is "to examine the nature and impact of war on state and society in later medieval Scotland".

He is also a deeply respected and talented cricketer famed for being a combative fast bowling all rounder playing mainly for Aberdeen Grammar School FPs.  He once famously claimed a hat trick to defeat Inverurie and has regularly made important contributions with bat and ball and is viewed as a top 1st slip by many.  Despite being hampered by injury in recent seasons, MacDonald has still managed to pile on runs in the lower leagues and remains a much feared opponent.

Publications
 Medieval Scotland 1100-1560, R. A. Houston & W. J. Knox (eds), The New Penguin History of Scotland. London: Penguin, 2001 (with co-editor David Ditchburn)
 Border Bloodshed. Scotland and England at War 1369-1403. East Linton: Tuckwell Press, 2000

References

External links
  Dr Macdonald's biodata at the University of Abderdeen's website

Living people
Academics of the University of Aberdeen
21st-century Scottish historians
Year of birth missing (living people)
Place of birth missing (living people)